The Riga Trial was a war crimes trial held in front of a Soviet military tribunal between 26 January and 3 February 1946 in Riga, Latvian Soviet Socialist Republic, Soviet Union against six high ranking Wehrmacht officers, Höheren SS- und Polizeiführer Friedrich Jeckeln and SA-Standartenführer Alexander Boecking.

All eight defendants were found guilty of war crimes during the German–Soviet War of 1941–45 and sentenced to death. They were publicly hanged immediately after sentencing. Only Wolfgang von Ditfurth escaped execution due to bad health. He died in prison from heart failure on 22 March 1946.

Proceedings 
Unlike some previous trials, the prosecutors wanted to and were able to prove concretely that the main defendant, Jeckeln, was responsible for the crimes of which he was accused. Thus Jeckeln, a Nazi "race warrior" who oversaw the Rumbula massacre in Latvia, could be proven guilty on the basis of his own statements, as well as testimonies of other participants and survivors of the massacres as well as on the basis of German documents. Not only had he given the orders, but he was also present in person for some of the time, and had even participated personally in the shootings and boasted about it. Prosecutors were able to trace his "blood trail" through Ukraine and the Baltic states as a commander of Einsatzgruppen death squads and determine his responsibility for the murder of over 100,000 Jews, Romani, and others. Jeckeln defended his actions on the grounds that he was acting on orders from Reichsführer SS Heinrich Himmler. 

Boecking, the area commissioner of the Tallinn district, was accused of the "Germanisation policy" in Estonia with the looting and extermination of Estonian people and the settlement of Germans in their place. Concrete accusations such as forced labour, forced relocation and looting were also made and concretely identified.

Defendants

References

Sources
 Mike Schmeitzer: Konsequente Abrechnung? – NS-Eliten im Visier sowjetischer Gerichte 1945–1947. In: Todesurteile sowjetischer Militärtribunale gegen Deutsche (1944–1947): eine historisch-biographische Studie. Vandenhoeck & Ruprecht, 2015, Page 63 and following.

Film 
 Hinrichtung, Film of the execution, Chronoshistory

1946 in law
1946 in the Soviet Union
Nazi war crimes trials
Trials in Latvia
Latvian Soviet Socialist Republic
War crimes trials in the Soviet Union
War crimes of the Wehrmacht